Deh-e Howz (also Romanized as Deh-e Ḩowẕ, Deh Ḩowz, and Deh Hoz; also known as Ḩowz) is a village in Susan-e Gharbi Rural District, Susan District, Izeh County, Khuzestan Province, Iran. At the 2006 census, its population was 235, in 42 families.

References 

Populated places in Izeh County